Ripogonum discolor, known as the prickly supplejack, is a common rainforest vine, found in eastern Australia. The original specimen was collected at the Clarence River.

The species occurs in the states of Queensland and New South Wales.

References

discolor
Flora of Queensland
Flora of New South Wales
Taxa named by Ferdinand von Mueller